Camilo Torres Restrepo (3 February 1929 – 15 February 1966) was a Colombian Marxist–Leninist, Roman Catholic priest, a proponent of liberation theology, and a member of the National Liberation Army (ELN), a guerrilla organization. During his life, he tried to reconcile revolutionary Marxism and Catholicism. His social activism and willingness to work with Marxists troubled some.

As part of the academic staff of the National University of Colombia, he was a co-founder of the Sociology Faculty together with Orlando Fals Borda, as well as some intellectuals such as  Eduardo Umaña Luna, María Cristina Salazar, Virginia Gutiérrez de Pineda, Carlos Escalante, Darío Botero and Tomás Ducay, in 1960.

His involvement in several student and political movements during the time won him a large following as well as many detractors, especially from the Colombian government and the church itself. Due to the growing pressure to back down from his radical politics, Camilo Torres was persecuted and went into hiding (leaving his job as an academic) by joining the guerrillas in Colombia.

He served as a low-ranking member of the ELN to whom he also provided spiritual assistance and inspiration from a Christian communist point of view. He was killed in his first combat engagement when the ELN ambushed a Colombian Military patrol. After his death, Camilo Torres was made an official martyr of the ELN.

He is perhaps best known for the quote: "If Jesus were alive today, He would be a guerrillero." He was a life-long friend of fellow socialist Luis Villar Borda and Colombian writer Gabriel García Márquez. In the Dominican Republic in 1970, a revolutionary group that included Catholic clergy members and university students was founded under the name CORECATO, which stood for Comando Revolucionario Camilo Torres (Revolutionary Command Camilo Torres). In New York City, San Romero of the Americas Church-UCC has founded the Camilo Torres Project in 2009. This project works for social justice and peace for the people of the Washington Heights community.

Biography

Childhood and education 

Jorge Camilo Torres Restrepo was born on 3 February 1929 in Bogotá into a well-to-do family of the liberal bourgeoisie. His mother Isabel told him the story of Father Cuco (Juan de la Cruz Gaviria), a liberal businessman who financed the military campaigns against the conservatives in the civil wars of the 19th century.

His parents took him to Europe when he was only two years old. He returned to the country in 1934. Three years later, in 1937, the couple separated, leaving Camilo and his brother Fernando at their mother's side. Expelled for his criticism of the teachers at the traditional Colegio Mayor de Nuestra Señora del Rosario, he finished his baccalaureate at the Liceo de Cervantes in 1946 where he met and became friends with Luis Villar Borda and Ricardo Samper.

His sister Gerda Westendorp Restrepo, daughter of Isabel Restrepo's first marriage, was a medical student (the first woman in Colombia to pursue a university degree). Her brother Fernando devoted himself to medicine like his father and older half-sister, and settled in the United States. He was close to Camilo although their professions caused them to see each other sporadically.

Camilo Torres entered the Faculty of Law at the Universidad Nacional de Colombia, where he would meet again with Villar Borda, and only studied there for the first semester. During this brief period Camilo and Luis edited the university page of the Bogota newspaper La Razón, and on some occasions wrote criticisms against some university magazines that they considered radical.

Influenced by the social ideas of two French Dominican priests, Nielly and Blanchet, whom he met through the father of his girlfriend Teresa Montalvo, daughter of a prestigious Bogota family, the idea of becoming a priest began to take hold of Camilo, and to make this decision, he withdrew to meditate in the eastern plains. After breaking up with his girlfriend and despite the reluctance of his mother and father, Camilo entered the Conciliar Seminary of Bogotá of the Archdiocese of Bogotá (in agreement with his parents to avoid entering the Dominican Seminary of Chiquinquirá which was in poor condition) where he remained for seven years, during which time he began to take an interest in social realities.

Priesthood and academic life 

Poverty and social injustice attracted his attention and, together with his fellow disciple Gustavo Pérez, he created a social studies circle that functioned even after Torres was ordained a priest in 1954 under the direction of Jonatan Gómez. Camilo started social activities in the neighbourhoods surrounding the Conciliar Seminary, which were populated by displaced families from the countryside.

In 1955, in order to specialize, Torres travelled to Belgium, to study for a few more years at the Catholic University of Louvain. The first months were very difficult for the Bogota priest because of the cold climate, Belgian food and the conditions of the boarding house where he lived with Gustavo; for this reason, at the end of the first semester, he moved with his mother to a flat. With a group of Colombian students at the university, he founded the ECISE (Equipo Colombiano de Investigación Socioeconómica) and came into contact with Christian Democracy, the Christian trade union movement and Algerian resistance groups in Paris. He founded the Bogota, Paris and London sections of ECISE. In 1957 he met Marguerite-Marie 'Guitemie' Olivieri, a Frenchwoman of Corso origin and bourgeois daughter of a doctor like Torres, who was to become his closest friend and secretary, and who by then was living in a poor neighbourhood of Paris, accompanying the pieds noirs in sabotage work against the French regime that was being imposed by force in Algeria. In turn, Torres met Villar Borda again in Berlin and spent holidays in Belgrade where he unsuccessfully wanted to exercise his priesthood, or failing that in Prague.

In 1958, the Belgian university awarded him the degree of sociologist. His doctoral thesis, Una aproximación estadística a la realidad socioeconómica de Bogotá, a pioneering work in urban sociology in Latin America, was published in 1987 under the title La proletarización de Bogotá.

In 1959, when he returned to Colombia, he felt compelled to actively support the cause of the poor and the working class. That year he was appointed auxiliary chaplain of the National University of Colombia, in Bogotá. The following year, in 1960, he participated along with Orlando Fals Borda, Carlos Escalante, Eduardo Umaña Luna, María Cristina Salazar, Darío Botero Uribe, Virginia Gutiérrez de Pineda and Tomás Ducay, among others, in the founding of the first faculty of Sociology in Latin America (today a department) of the Universidad Nacional de Colombia, where he was a professor and was close to and popular with the students. He was a founding member and president of the Movimiento Universitario de Promoción Comunal (MUNIPROC). With the creation of the Juntas de Acción Comunal (JAC), promoted by the government of Alberto Lleras Camargo, from Law 9 of 1958, Torres recognises in it the possibility of decentralising political power and giving possibilities of empowerment to grassroots communities. Together with teachers and students, he carried out community action programmes in working-class neighbourhoods in Bogotá. Torres was also the organiser of the IX Congress of the Latin American Sociological Association.

MUNIPROC's work led to the founding of the first Junta de Acción Comunal (JAC) in Tunjuelito, at that time a working class enclave in the south of Bogotá, where he had been working continuously for several years. In 1963, he chaired the first National Congress of Sociology, also held in Tunjuelito (Bogotá), and presented the study "La violencia y los cambios socio-culturales en las áreas rurales colombianas" (Violence and socio-cultural changes in rural areas of Colombia). Torres was also a member of the technical committee of the agrarian reform founded by the Colombian Institute of Agrarian Reform (INCORA), where he represented the most reformist position of the Board of Directors, which was divided between the Conservative and Liberal parties, typical of the National Front but considered by Torres an inefficient entity in the face of the needs of the Colombian countryside. In his career as a member of the Board, the episode of the project to set up an Agrarian School in Yopal (Casanare) and the difficulties presented by the then director of INCORA Enrique Peñalosa Camargo (liberal, father of the former mayor of Bogotá Enrique Peñalosa Londoño) and Álvaro Gómez Hurtado (conservative, son of former president Laureano Gómez) stand out.

During this period of his life he was interested in founding a farm-school in Yopal (Casanare), as part of the rural action programme that he encouraged in the region and which would go on to achieve other organisational successes; on the board of the Incora, he sparked off a controversy over the application of the law of extinction of ownership restricted to uncultivated lands, which brought him into conflict with Álvaro Gómez Hurtado, also a member of that body and head of the "Laureanist" group of the Conservative Party. Because of the resonance of this conflict, some conservative bishops wrote to the Cardinal to request his dismissal from the board. Invited to Peru, he gave courses and lectures on the subject of agrarian reform and social change. His view of the Latin American situation is not flattering, as he expresses it in a letter from Lima. He writes:

In 1962, the year in which the Second Vatican Council was initiated by Pope John XXIII, Torres was one of the first priests to offer a mass facing forward and in Spanish, when by then the mass was offered facing backwards and in Latin. Between 8 and 9 June of that year, under pressure from Cardinal Luis Concha Córdoba, after entering, together with other professors, into contradictions with the rector, by honouring at mass the students killed after a demonstration repressed by the National Police and by opposing the expulsion of other students, he was forced to resign from all his activities at the National University of Colombia, being transferred to the Church of La Veracruz in Bogotá as coadjutor; assistant to the parish priest with only confession and baptismal certificate functions. This unleashed a strong depression in Torres, who wanted to be close to the people. Shortly before, the Colombian Communist Youth (JUCO) had proposed Torres as rector of the University to a possible shortlist of three but Torres politely declined the offer for fear of tarnishing his name.

In 1964, Concha would later relieve Torres as coadjutor, only admiring Torres as a sociologist, allowing him to become an associate professor in the Faculty of Sociology. He was in turn appointed dean of the Institute of Social Administration of the Escuela Superior de Administración Pública (ESAP) and promoted to member of the Board of Directors of INCORA.

The Unidad de Acción Rural de Yopal (UARY) was inaugurated on 1 March 1964, after overcoming the bureaucratic obstacles of the Ministry of Agriculture, which allowed him to work at the grassroots with the peasants of the capital of the plains. He combined this with the struggles in the junta, especially with the conservative politician who was a staunch defender of the interests of the landowners. He first considered creating a guerrilla group together with Álvaro Marroquín, a student at the National University and member of the JUCO. Torres in turn considered INCORA a deficient entity to attend to the needs of the Colombian peasantry, especially in informal education for their organization in search of an agrarian reform different to that proposed by INCORA.

Entering politics 

The Cuban Revolution, which impacted every country in the Americas, caught Torres' attention after he returned to Colombia from Europe. In 1965, the Movimiento Revolucionario Liberal (MRL) went into decline after its split following the presidential elections of 1962. The 1964 parliamentary elections were marked by an enormous abstention, in which Torres concluded that the traditional parties; Liberal and Conservative, were abandoned by public opinion, so he considered creating a new instrument that would bring together the "Non-aligned" in politics; unions, guilds, associations, students and workers, to confront the decadent traditional parties, although for the time being calling for abstentionism. Torres also tried unsuccessfully to act as a mediator between the peasants and the National Army to prevent the attack on the so-called Independent Republic of Marquetalia, which was his first contact with the Colombian Communist Party.

The American-sponsored attempt to overthrow the Cuban regime rallied socialist guerrillas and revolutionary student movements across the Latin America, and it exposed Torres to the ideas of anti-imperialism. At the time, he identified as progressive Catholic and wasn't afraid to raise topics such as poverty and unstable political situation of Colombia. His light-hearted manners made his masses appeal to a wider public, even including atheists. This also marked the time of his rapid radicalization. Torres argued that the Catholic Church is devoted to charity and fighting social inequality, crediting the Church with introducing revolutionary changes to society such as the abolition of slavery and democratic valorization of the human being. However, he believed that in order to truly realise the concept of Christian charity, a total change of power structures was needed, as the hitherto structures were responsible for social and economical inequality and poverty:

He pointed out that the ones who were in the forefront of the fight to change structures were Marxists, and this brought him to the conclusion that collaborating with the Marxists was a necessity. At the same time, he discussed the Marxist thought in his writings - he criticised vanguardism, attacking Lenin's concept of "the revolution by the elite", insisting that a revolution can only be carried out by ordinary people instead. He regarded Marxist humanism as a product of Christian humanist movement, and argued that Marxist principles stem from Christianity itself. He began to admire socialists for fighting for a better society, and believed that Catholics should support their efforts:

In 1964, the Cardinal Luis Concha Córdoba informed the national public opinion that no priest could collaborate in the socioeconomic study commission that had been set up to intervene in the case of Marquetalia, Tolima; this commission, of which Camilo Torres was a member, was trying to evaluate the situation in that region and at the same time to prevent a military solution to the conflict. An attempt is being made to stop a peasant movement that has declared the area an "independent republic". In the absence of support and guarantees, the rest of the commission was forced to back down - bombings and military occupation of the region followed, leading to the withdrawal of the peasant militias that would later form the guerrilla movement known as the Revolutionary Armed Forces of Colombia. At least in its first period, the FARC had the backing of the Colombian Communist Party.

Later the same year, Torres came into closer contact with groups that agreed with the armed revolution or were already committed to it. He was sympathetic to these groups and his solidarity with them grew stronger and stronger. The Cuban-oriented guerrilla group, the National Liberation Army was founded on 4 July 1964, and made its public appearance with the seizure of the town of Simacota in Santander on 7 January 1965. Camilo considered it extremely important to connect with this insurgent group and he managed to do so through his urban networks.

In 1965, his activities as head of the Institute of Social Administration of the ESAP began to be strongly criticised for their political bias. Faced with the failure of some intellectuals who had undertaken to write articles and papers for a publication aimed at making the situation of Colombian society visible from the perspective of the social sciences, Camilo drafted a political platform open to debate by different groups of intellectuals, students and workers, in which he proposed the union of the popular class to socially renovate the country. This document was widely disseminated during his travels around the country and, thanks to the discussion it was subjected to during this tour, became the platform of the United Front of the Colombian People, the political movement that Camilo promoted as an alternative for the transformation of society in Colombia.

The United Front 

The National Front regime led Camilo Torres in January 1964 to found the Frente Unido del Pueblo; a movement in opposition to the coalition of the traditional parties. Torres went to the home of Marroquín and his partner María Arango to seek contacts with the Communist Party. A meeting with the goal to create a political platform was held, with the participation of the MOEC, the MRL Youth, the JUCO and some student groups from the Universidad de los Andes. However, the hierarchs of the Colombian Church sought to make Torres travel to Leuven, with the ESAP offering to cover the travel costs. However, a meeting in homage to Torres held by the students of the National University dissuaded Torres from travelling. Although Torres was not yet politically active and had no  clear political discourse, he was already quite popular.

Torres sought to bring together all the opposition of the time (Anapo, MRL and Colombian Communist Party); however, he didn't declare himself a Marxist due to the atheism of the ideology, but related several points to Catholicism itself instead. In June 1965, Torres was reduced to the lay state by his ecclesiastical superior, Cardinal Concha, given his practices and teachings that disregarded what was already established by the Catholic Church in the condemnation of atheistic communism made by Pope Pius XI in his encyclical Divini Redemptoris in the year 1937, and which was confirmed by Pope John Paul II in two documents published by the Congregation for the Doctrine of the Faith during his pontificate in 1984 and 1986 which set out the errors being promulgated by the liberation theology, and at the same time he was removed from his post at ESAP and once again had disagreements with Cardinal Concha, who offered him and his coadjutor bishop Rubén Isaza the post of director of sociology department in the Archbishopric of Bogotá with the mediation of the then priest Ernesto Umaña de Brigard. Torres turned down the offer, seeing that the position was to prevent him from intervening in politics as well as presenting the socio-political platform in Medellín, which was the reason why he had previously been removed from his position at the ESAP. Cardinal Concha argued that the platform went against Catholic ideals and that priests should be apolitical in order to dissociate themselves from Catholicism's ambiguous and traditional relationship with the Conservative Party. Torres met with Concha who vehemently opposed Torres' entry into politics. Umaña then met with Torres and offered him an ecclesiastical post, but Torres requested a dispensation so that he could devote himself to politics and avoid problems with the ecclesiastical authority. Concha accepted the dispensation but offered Torres to accept it if he returned to the priesthood. Torres gave his last mass on 27 June 1965 in the Church of San Diego in Bogotá. Torres then travelled to Lima returning to Bogotá on 3 July to be received by his mother and a crowd of young people.

The platform of his movement sought to address the needs of rural and urban areas, to eliminate the restricted democracy of the National Front at all costs, and the participation of the Church in Liberation Theology. However, the National Front lacked a clear political platform, despite being close to and sympathetic to the revolutionary left; they also had their own newspaper, headed by Pedro Acosta, of the same name, which was only distributed three times a week from 26 August 1965, printed in the workshops of the Antares publishing house and owned by Torres' friend Gonzalo Canal Ramírez. Despite the growing popularity of the United Front, Torres decided to contact Fabio Vásquez Castaño through student leader Jaime Arenas on 6 July 1965, who had previously led the strike at the Universidad Industrial de Santander. The United Front lasted from August to September 1965 (one month) after breaking with Christian Democracy for imposing a guerrilla line. His decision to resort to armed struggle was taken in the case of Jorge Eliécer Gaitán and expressed to Gloria Gaitán, daughter of the assassinated leader, who offered asylum to Torres, who gradually went underground. Despite this, Torres led a peaceful march with his students in Medellín and was arrested with his demonstrators, all university students, and held at the Asociación Sindical Antioqueña. He would later be intercepted in Ventaquemada on his way to Tunja, and in Bogotá he would also be detained after police repression of a demonstration by the Frente Unido. On 7 January 1966, Torres announced his incorporation into the ELN.

Catholic Guerrilla 

In the guerrilla, Torres was mentored and advised by Jaime Arenas, chosen by Fabio Vásquez, also to keep him away from progressive currents. Shortly before joining the ELN, General Gustavo Rojas Pinilla, leader of the ANAPO, had recommended Torres not to join any guerrilla group, since being a priest he had no experience in handling weapons to confront the army, so he suggested that he continue in political life since he admired his work with the needy classes, something that Torres disregarded considering the advice as a threat. On joining the ELN, under the nom de guerre of Argemiro, the identity of Torres, who was mistaken for a foreigner, was unknown for the moment within the guerrillas, but his identity was later revealed to the guerrillas.

As he explained in his "Message to the Christians" published in the first issue of Frente Unido, he realised that the "effective means for the well-being of the majorities ... are not going to be sought by the minorities" and "will not be sought by the privileged minorities in power, because generally these effective means oblige the minorities to sacrifice their privileges", Torres concluded that "it is therefore necessary to take power away from the privileged minorities to give it to the poor majorities" and that "the Revolution is not only permitted but obligatory for Christians who see in it the only effective and ample way of realising love for all". This is how Camilo Torres justified his decision in 1965 to quit his job as a teacher and priest, and join the guerrilla, more precisely the National Liberation Army (ELN), although he had previously been interested in joining the Revolutionary Armed Forces of Colombia (FARC) due to his peasant background.

In the ELN, Torres participated as a low-ranking member and provided spiritual and ideological assistance from a Marxist-Christian point of view. However, his performance as a guerrilla was poor as he was not used to the arduous training (being assisted by a comrade) and to carrying a rifle, so he was barely given a pistol and was emphasised for his role of spiritual and ideological assistance as well as being a good cook. He died in his first combat experience, when the ELN ambushed a patrol of the National Army. After his death, Camilo Torres became an official martyr of the ELN.

Death 

Torres died on 15 February 1966 in Patio Cemento, after combat with troops of the Fifth Brigade from Bucaramanga, led by Colonel Álvaro Valencia Tovar, who, ironically years earlier, was his childhood friend. The National Army hid the body in a strategic location separate from the other mass graves and the location was not revealed to the public. A symbolic funeral was held in the church of San Diego and a symbolic burial was held. A mass was also held in the grounds of the National University.

Shortly after Torres's death, 'Guitemie' Olivieri, despite being linked to the ELN, was persecuted by the Colombian authorities and was helped by Junior Fajardo and Rita Restrepo de Agudelo to obtain political asylum, first in Panama, then in Mexico where she married ex-priest Óscar Maldonado, finally in Cuba and then in France.

Years later, Valencia Tovar, now retired as a general, wrote the book El final de Camilo, in which he clarified details of the death of Camilo Torres. According to Valencia Tovar, Torres was buried in a detailed place, and they prepared the procedures to hand over the remains to the family. His older brother, doctor Fernando Torres Restrepo, who lived in the United States, was informed about the fate of his brother.

In addition, General Álvaro Valencia Tovar himself revealed in an interview to the magazine Semana that the body of Camilo Torres was exhumed three years after his burial, his remains were placed in an urn and transported to Bucaramanga where, through the efforts of the general himself, the Military Pantheon of the Fifth Brigade of the National Army was created and the first remains to occupy a place in that pantheon were those of Camilo Torres, although he did not reveal their exact location, leaving the retired general's statements in doubt among the ELN high command.

In January 2016, the President of Colombia, Juan Manuel Santos, instructed the Colombian National Army to begin the process of searching for and exhuming his remains, in a gesture to accelerate the start of the peace talks with the ELN guerrilla group.

See also
Christian communism

References

Further reading
Broderick, Walter J.  Camilo Torres: A Biography of the Priest-Guerrillero 1975.
Guzmán, Germán. Camilo Torres. translated by John D. Ring. 1969.
Levine, Daniel H. "Camilo Torres: fe, política y violencia." Sociedad y Religión: Sociología, Antropología e Historia de la Religión en el Cono Sur 21.34-35 (2011): 59-91.
Martínez Morales, Darío. "Camilo Torres Restrepo: cristianismo e violência." Theologica Xaveriana 61.171 (2011): 131-167.

External links

Science, revolution and belief in Camilo Torres: a secular Colombia? por Alejandro Sánchez Lopera (English version) Revista Nómadas Colombia
Ciencia, revolución y creencia en la experiencia de Camilo Torres: ¿una Colombia secular? por Alejandro Sánchez Lopera - Revista Nómadas Colombia
Camilo Torres Restrepo: La posibilidad de una moral insurgente Book Chapter
Biography from filosofia.org
Biography from Marxists.org
"Camilo Torres, Primer sacerdote guerrillero"

1929 births
1966 deaths
Members of the National Liberation Army (Colombia)
Stalinism
Anti-revisionists
Catholic socialists
Catholic University of Leuven (1834–1968) alumni
Colombian Christian socialists
Christian communists
Colombian rebels
Colombian revolutionaries
20th-century Colombian Roman Catholic priests
Liberation theologians
People from Bogotá
Catholicism and far-left politics